The Keşla 2020–21 season was Keşla's twentieth season in the Azerbaijan Premier League.

Season events
On 8 August, Tarlan Ahmedov left the club after his contract expired, with Yunis Huseynov being appointed as his replacement on 16 August.

On 24 January, Yunis Huseynov resigned as manager, with Sanan Gurbanov being appointed as the clubs new manager on 25 January.

Transfers
On 22 June, Tural Akhundov signed for Keşla from Neftçi.

On 24 June, Shahriyar Aliyev joined Keşla from Sumgayit.

On 30 June, Javid Imamverdiyev signed for Keşla from Sabah.

On 8 July, Keşla announced the signing of Rahman Hajiyev on a season-long loan deal from Neftçi.

On 21 July, Turan Valizade also joined Keşla on a season-long loan deal from Neftçi.

On 7 August, Keşla announced the signing of Dmytro Klyots to a one-year contract, from Karpaty Lviv. Two days later, 9 August, Keşla signed Sílvio to a one-year contract from Vllaznia.

On 14 August, Keşla announced the signing of Kamal Bayramov on a one-year contract from Sabail, whilst Artur also signed a one-year contract with Keşla on 16 August, having previously been with Vorskla Poltava.

On 24 August, Keşla announced the signing of Rail Malikov from Sumgayit.

On 9 September, Keşla announced the signing of Alvaro to a one year loan from Lviv.

On 18 September, Javid Imamverdiyev left Keşla to join Sumgayit.

On 18 September, César Meza returned to Keşla on a  contract until the end of the season.

On 30 November, Keşla announced the departure of Artur by mutual consent and the end if Alvaro's loan deal from Lviv.

On 26 December, Keşla signed Anatole Abang to a one-year contract.

On 6 January, Keşla announced the signing of Nijat Gurbanov on a contract until the end of the season.

On 12 January, Keşla announced that they had agreed to mutual terminate the contract of Dmytro Klyots, with Sadio Tounkara signing for Keşla until the end of the season on 13 January.

On 28 January, Rashad Sadiqov left Keşla after his contract was terminated by mutual consent.

On 9 February, Keşla announced that they had signed Eugeniu Cociuc on a free transfer after he'd left Sabah in December 2020.

New contracts
On 4 July, Stanislav Namașco signed a new one-year contract with Keşla.

On 10 July, Alexander Christovão extended his contract with Keşla for an additional year.

Squad

Transfers

In

Loans in

Out

Released

Friendlies

Competitions

Premier League

Results summary

Results by round

Results

League table

Azerbaijan Cup

Final

UEFA Europa League

Qualifying rounds

Squad statistics

Appearances and goals

|-
|colspan="14"|Players away on loan:
|-
|colspan="14"|Players who left Keşla during the season:

|}

Goal scorers

Clean sheets

Disciplinary record

References

External links 
 Inter Baku at Soccerway.com

Shamakhi FK seasons
Azerbaijani football clubs 2020–21 season
Keşla